Lasiini is a tribe of ants in the family Formicidae. There are about 10 genera and more than 450 described species in Lasiini.

Genera
These genera belong to the tribe Lasiini:
 Acanthomyops Mayr, 1862
 Anoplolepis Santschi, 1914
 Euprenolepis Emery, 1906
 Lasius Fabricius, 1804 – cornfield ants, citronella ants
 Myrmecocystus Wesmael, 1838 – honeypot ants
 Nylanderia Emery, 1906 – crazy ants
 Paratrechina Motschoulsky, 1863
 Prenolepis Mayr, 1861 – false honey ants
 Protrechina Wilson, 1985
 Pseudolasius Emery, 1887
 Teratomyrmex McAreavey, 1957

References

Formicinae
Articles created by Qbugbot